Frederick Francis II (German: Friedrich Franz II; 28 February 1823 – 15 April 1883) was a Prussian officer and Grand Duke of Mecklenburg-Schwerin from 7 March 1842 until 15 April 1883.

Biography
He was born in Schloss Ludwigslust, the eldest son of Hereditary Grand Duke Paul Friedrich of Mecklenburg-Schwerin and his wife Princess Alexandrine of Prussia. He became heir apparent to the grand duchy following the death of his great-grandfather Frederick Francis I on 1 February 1837. Frederick Francis was privately educated until 1838. He then attended the Blochmann institute in Dresden before going to the University of Bonn. Frederick Francis succeeded his father as Grand Duke on 7 March 1842.

During the Second Schleswig War Frederick Francis served on the staff of Generalfeldmarschall Friedrich Graf von Wrangel, having refused a command in the fight against Denmark since Christian IX of Denmark was a close friend. During the Austro-Prussian War he commanded the forces that occupied Leipzig and lay siege to Nuremberg. He also took part in the Franco-Prussian War, during which he was made Governor-General of Reims and commanded the German forces laying siege to Toul. He defended the Prussian forces during the Siege of Paris from attack by the Army of the Loire. He defeated French forces at the battles of Beaune-La-Rolande and Beaugency. He was a maternal first cousin of both German Emperor Frederick III and Russian Tsar Alexander II. He held the rank of Prussian general and was also a Russian General Field Marshal.

Frederick Francis died on 15 April 1883 in Schwerin. He was succeeded as Grand Duke by his eldest son Frederick Francis III.

Marriages and children
Frederick Francis was first married to Princess Augusta Reuss of Köstritz ( 26 May 1822 – 3 March 1862) on 3 November 1849 in Ludwigslust. They had six children:

Frederick Francis III, Grand Duke of Mecklenburg-Schwerin (19 March 1851 – 10 April 1897) he married Grand Duchess Anastasia Mikhailovna of Russia on 24 January 1879. They had three children.
Duke Paul Frederick of Mecklenburg-Schwerin (19 September 1852 – 17 May 1923) he married Princess Marie of Windisch-Graetz. on 5 May 1881. They had four children. 
Duchess Marie of Mecklenburg-Schwerin (14 May 1854 – 5 September 1920) she married Grand Duke Vladimir Alexandrovich of Russia on 28 August 1874. They had five children. 
Duke Nikolaus of Mecklenburg-Schwerin (18 August 1855 – 23 January 1856) died at five months old.
Duke Johann Albrecht of Mecklenburg-Schwerin (8 December 1857 – 16 February 1920) he married Princess Elisabeth Sybille of Saxe-Weimar-Eisenach (28 February 1854 – 10 July 1908) on 6 November 1886. He remarried Princess Elisabeth of Stolberg-Rossla on 15 December 1909.
Duke Alexander of Mecklenburg-Schwerin (13 August 1859 – 13 August 1859)

Frederick Francis married for a second time in Darmstadt to Princess Anna of Hesse and by Rhine (25 May 1843 – 16 April 1865) on 4 July 1864. They had one daughter:

Duchess Anna of Mecklenburg-Schwerin (7 April 1865 – 8 February 1882) died at the age of sixteen.

His third wife was Princess Marie of Schwarzburg-Rudolstadt on 4 July 1868. They had four children:
Duchess Elisabeth Alexandrine of Mecklenburg-Schwerin (10 August 1869 – 3 September 1955) she married Frederick Augustus II, Grand Duke of Oldenburg on 24 October 1896. They had five children.
Duke Friedrich Wilhelm of Mecklenburg-Schwerin (5 April 1871 – 22 September 1897) died at the age of twenty-six. 
Duke Adolf Friedrich of Mecklenburg-Schwerin (10 October 1873 – 5 August 1969) he married Princess Viktoria Feodora of Reuss zu Schleiz (21 April 1889 – 18 December 1918) on 24 April 1917. They had one daughter Duchess Woizlawa Feodora of Mecklenburg-Schwerin (1918-2019), later Princess Reuß zu Köstritz. After the death of his first wife, Adolf Friedrich remarried Princess Elisabeth of Stolberg-Rossla on 15 October 1924. 
Duke Heinrich of Mecklenburg-Schwerin ( 19 April 1876 – 3 July 1934) he married Queen Wilhelmina of the Netherlands on 7 February 1901. They had one daughter: Queen Juliana.

Honours
German decorations

Foreign decorations
 : Grand Cross of the Royal Hungarian Order of St. Stephen, 1844
 : Knight of the Elephant, 5 April 1842
  Kingdom of Greece: Grand Cross of the Redeemer
 : Knight of the Annunciation, 6 June 1870
 : Grand Cross of the Gold Lion of Nassau
 : Order of Osmanieh, 1st Class
 : Grand Cross of the Tower and Sword
 :
 Knight of St. Andrew
 Knight of St. Alexander Nevsky
 Knight of the White Eagle
 Knight of St. Anna, 1st Class
 : Grand Cross of the Order of Charles III, 24 September 1865

Ancestors

References

External links

1823 births
1883 deaths
Dukes of Mecklenburg-Schwerin
House of Mecklenburg-Schwerin
Protestant monarchs
German landowners
German Protestants
German military personnel of the Franco-Prussian War
Field marshals of Russia
University of Bonn alumni
Burials at Schwerin Cathedral
Hereditary Grand Dukes of Mecklenburg-Schwerin
Grand Dukes of Mecklenburg-Schwerin
People from Ludwigslust
Colonel generals of Prussia
19th-century Prussian military personnel
Grand Crosses of the Military Order of Max Joseph
Recipients of the Pour le Mérite (military class)
Grand Crosses of the Order of Saint Stephen of Hungary
Recipients of the Grand Cross of the Iron Cross
Military personnel from Mecklenburg-Western Pomerania